The Girondins, or Girondists, were members of a loosely knit political faction during the French Revolution. From 1791 to 1793, the Girondins were active in the Legislative Assembly and the National Convention. Together with the Montagnards, they initially were part of the Jacobin movement. They campaigned for the end of the monarchy, but then resisted the spiraling momentum of the Revolution, which caused a conflict with the more radical Montagnards. They dominated the movement until their fall in the insurrection of 31 May – 2 June 1793, which resulted in the domination of the Montagnards and the purge and eventual mass execution of the Girondins. This event is considered to mark the beginning of the Reign of Terror.

The Girondins were a group of loosely affiliated individuals rather than an organized political party and the name was at first informally applied because the most prominent exponents of their point of view were deputies to the Legislative Assembly from the département of Gironde in southwest France. Girondin leader Jacques Pierre Brissot proposed an ambitious military plan to spread the Revolution internationally, therefore the Girondins were the war party in 1792–1793. Other prominent Girondins included Jean Marie Roland and his wife Madame Roland. They also had an ally in the English-born American activist Thomas Paine.

Brissot and Madame Roland were executed and Jean Roland (who had gone into hiding) committed suicide when he learned about the execution. Paine was imprisoned, but he narrowly escaped execution. The famous painting The Death of Marat depicts the fiery radical journalist and denouncer of the Girondins Jean-Paul Marat after being stabbed to death in his bathtub by Charlotte Corday, a Girondin sympathizer. Corday did not attempt to flee and was arrested and executed.

Identity 
The collective name "Girondins" is used to describe "a loosely knit group of French deputies who contested the Montagnards for control of the National Convention".

They were never an official organization or political party. The name itself was bestowed not by any of its alleged members but by the Montagnards, "who claimed as early as April 1792 that a counterrevolutionary faction had coalesced around deputies of the department of the Gironde". Jacques-Pierre Brissot, Jean Marie Roland and François Buzot were among the most prominent of such deputies and contemporaries called their supporters Brissotins, Rolandins, or Buzotins, depending on which politician was being blamed for their leadership. Other names were employed at the time too, but "Girondins" ultimately became the term favored by historians. The term became standard with Alphonse de Lamartine's History of the Girondins in 1847.

History

Rise 

Twelve deputies represented the département of the Gironde and there were six who sat for this département in both the Legislative Assembly of 1791–1792 and the National Convention of 1792–1795. Five were lawyers: Pierre Victurnien Vergniaud, Marguerite-Élie Guadet, Armand Gensonné, Jean Antoine Laffargue de Grangeneuve and Jean Jay (who was also a Protestant pastor). The other, Jean François Ducos, was a tradesman. In the Legislative Assembly, they represented a compact body of opinion which, though not as yet definitely republican (i.e. against the monarchy), was considerably more "advanced" than the moderate royalism of the majority of the Parisian deputies.

A group of deputies from elsewhere became associated with these views, most notably the Marquis de Condorcet, Claude Fauchet, Marc David Lasource, Maximin Isnard, the Comte de Kersaint, Henri Larivière and above all Jacques Pierre Brissot, Jean Marie Roland and Jérôme Pétion, who was elected mayor of Paris in succession to Jean Sylvain Bailly on 16 November 1791.

Madame Roland, whose salon became their gathering place, had a powerful influence on the spirit and policy of the Girondins with her "romantic republicanism". The party cohesion they possessed was connected to the energy of Brissot, who came to be regarded as their mouthpiece in the Assembly and in the Jacobin Club, hence the name "Brissotins" for his followers.  The group was identified by its enemies at the start of the National Convention (20 September 1792). "Brissotins" and "Girondins" were terms of opprobrium used by their enemies in a separate faction of the Jacobin Club, who freely denounced them as enemies of democracy.

Foreign policy 
In the Legislative Assembly, the Girondins represented the principle of democratic revolution within France and patriotic defiance to the European powers. They supported an aggressive foreign policy and constituted the war party in the period 1792–1793, when revolutionary France initiated a long series of revolutionary wars with other European powers.  Brissot proposed an ambitious military plan to spread the Revolution internationally, one that Napoleon later pursued aggressively. Brissot called on the National Convention to dominate Europe by conquering the Rhineland, Poland and the Netherlands with a goal of creating a protective ring of satellite republics in Great Britain, Spain and Italy by 1795. The Girondins also called for war against Austria, arguing it would rally patriots around the Revolution, liberate oppressed peoples from despotism, and test the loyalty of King Louis XVI.

Montagnards versus Girondins 

Girondins at first dominated the Jacobin Club, where Brissot's influence had not yet been ousted by Maximilien Robespierre and they did not hesitate to use this advantage to stir up popular passion and intimidate those who sought to stay the progress of the Revolution. They compelled the king in 1792 to choose a ministry composed of their partisans, among them Roland, Charles François Dumouriez, Étienne Clavière and Joseph Marie Servan de Gerbey; and they forced a declaration of war against Habsburg Austria the same year. In all of this activity, there was no apparent line of cleavage between La Gironde and The Mountain. Montagnards and Girondins alike were fundamentally opposed to the monarchy; both were democrats as well as republicans; and both were prepared to appeal to force in order to realise their ideals. Despite being accused of wanting to weaken the central government ("federalism"), the Girondins desired as little as the Montagnards to break up the unity of France. From the first, the leaders of the two parties stood in avowed opposition, in the Jacobin Club as in the Assembly.

Temperament largely accounts for the dividing line between the parties. The Girondins were doctrinaires and theorists rather than men of action. They initially encouraged armed petitions, but then were dismayed when this led to the émeute (riot) of 20 June 1792. Jean-Marie Roland was typical of their spirit, turning the Ministry of the Exterior into a publishing office for tracts on civic virtues while riotous mobs were burning the châteaux unchecked in the provinces. Girondins did not share the ferocious fanaticism or the ruthless opportunism of the future Montagnard organisers of the Reign of Terror. As the Revolution developed, the Girondins often found themselves opposing its results; the overthrow of the monarchy on 10 August 1792 and the September Massacres of 1792 occurred while they still nominally controlled the government, but the Girondins tried to distance themselves from the results of the September Massacres.

When the National Convention first met on 22 September 1792, the core of like-minded deputies from the Gironde expanded as Jean-Baptiste Boyer-Fonfrède, Jacques Lacaze and François Bergoeing joined five of the six stalwarts of the Legislative Assembly (Jean Jay, the Protestant pastor, drifted toward the Montagnard faction). Their numbers were increased by the return to national politics by former National Constituent Assembly deputies such as Jean-Paul Rabaut Saint-Étienne, Pétion and Kervélégan, as well as some newcomers as the writer Thomas Paine and popular journalist Jean Louis Carra.

Decline and fall 

The Girondins proposed suspending  the king and summoning of the National Convention, but they agreed not to overthrow the monarchy until Louis XVI became impervious to their counsels. Once the king was overthrown in 1792 and a republic was established, they were anxious to stop the revolutionary movement that they had helped to set in motion. Girondins and historian Pierre Claude François Daunou argues in his Mémoires that the Girondins were too cultivated and too polished to retain their popularity for long in times of disturbance, and so they were more inclined to work for the establishment of order, which would mean the guarantee of their own power. The Girondins, who had been the radicals of the Legislative Assembly (1791–1792), became the conservatives of the Convention (1792–1795).

The Revolution failed to deliver the immediate gains that had been promised and this made it difficult for the Girondins to draw it to a close easily in the minds of the public. Moreover, the Septembriseurs (the supporters of the September Massacres such as Robespierre, Danton, Marat and their lesser allies) realised that not only their influence but their safety depended on keeping the Revolution alive. Robespierre, who hated the Girondins, had proposed to include them in the proscription lists of September 1792: The Mountain Club to a man who desired their overthrow. A group including some Girondins prepared a draft constitution known as the Girondin constitutional project, which was presented to the National Convention in early 1793. Thomas Paine was one of the signers of this proposal.

The crisis came in March 1793. The Girondins, who had a majority in the Convention, controlled the executive council and filled the ministries, believed themselves invincible. Their orators had no serious rivals in the hostile camp—their system was established in mere reason, but the Montagnards made up for what they lacked in talent or in numbers through their boldness and energy. This was especially fruitful since uncommitted delegates accounted for almost half the total number, even though the Jacobins and Brissotins formed the largest groups. The more radical rhetoric of the Jacobins attracted the support of the revolutionary Paris Commune, the Revolutionary Sections (mass assemblies in districts) and the National Guard of Paris and they had gained control of the Jacobin club, where Brissot, absorbed in departmental work, had been superseded by Robespierre. At the trial of Louis XVI in 1792, most Girondins had voted for the "appeal to the people" and so laid themselves open to the charge of "royalism". They denounced the domination of Paris and summoned provincial levies to their aid and so fell under suspicion of "federalism" as on September 25, 1792. They strengthened the revolutionary Commune by first decreeing its abolition but withdrawing the decree at the first sign of popular opposition.

In the suspicious temper of the times, their vacillation was fatal. Marat never ceased his denunciations of the faction by which France was being betrayed to her ruin and his cry of Nous sommes trahis! ("We are betrayed!") was echoed from group to group in the streets of Paris. The growing hostility of Paris to the Girondins received a fateful demonstration by the election on 15 February 1793 of the bitter ex-Girondin Jean-Nicolas Pache to the mayoralty. Pache had twice been minister of war in the Girondins government, but his incompetence had laid him open to strong criticism and on 4 February 1793 he had been replaced as minister of war by a vote of the Convention. This was enough to secure him the votes of the Paris electors when he was elected mayor ten days later. The Mountain was strengthened by the accession of a significant ally whose one idea was to use his new power to avenge himself on his former colleagues. Mayor Pache, with procureur of the Commune Pierre Gaspard Chaumette and deputy procureur Jacques René Hébert, controlled the armed militias of the 48 revolutionary Sections of Paris and prepared to turn this weapon against the Convention. The abortive émeute of 10 March warned the Girondins of their danger and they responded with defensive moves. They unintentionally increased the prestige of their most vocal and bitter critic Marat by prosecuting him before the Revolutionary Tribunal, where his acquittal in April 1793 was a foregone conclusion.  The Commission of Twelve was appointed of on 24 May, including the arrest of Varlat and Hébert and other precautionary measures. The ominous threat by Girondin leader Maximin Isnard, uttered on 25 May, to "march France upon Paris" was instead met by Paris marching hastily upon the Convention. The Girondin role in the government was undermined by the popular uprisings of 27 and 31 May and finally on 2 June 1793, when François Hanriot, head of the Paris National Guards, purged the Convention of the Girondins (see Insurrection of 31 May – 2 June 1793).

Reign of Terror 

A list drawn up by the Commandant-General of the Parisian National Guard François Hanriot (with help from Marat) and endorsed by a decree of the intimidated Convention, included 22 Girondin deputies and 10 of the 12 members of the Commission of Twelve, who were ordered to be detained at their lodgings "under the safeguard of the people". Some submitted, among them Gensonné, Guadet, Vergniaud, Pétion, Birotteau and Boyer-Fonfrède. Others, including Brissot, Louvet, Buzot, Lasource, Grangeneuve, Larivière and François Bergoeing, escaped from Paris and, joined later by Guadet, Pétion and Birotteau, set to work to organise a movement of the provinces against the capital. This attempt to stir up civil war made the wavering and frightened Convention suddenly determined. On 13 June 1793, it voted that the city of Paris deserved well of the country and ordered the imprisonment of the detained deputies, the filling up of their places in the Assembly by their suppléants and the initiation of vigorous measures against the movement in the provinces. The assassination of Marat by Charlotte Corday on 13 July 1793 only served to increase the unpopularity of the Girondins and seal their fate.

The excuse for the Terror that followed was the imminent peril of France, menaced on the east by the advance of the armies of the First Coalition (Austria, Prussia and Great Britain) on the west by the Royalist Revolt in the Vendée and the need for preventing at all costs the outbreak of another civil war. On 28 July 1793, a decree of the Convention proscribed 21 deputies, five of whom were from the Gironde, as traitors and enemies of their country (Charles-Louis Antiboul, Boilleau the younger, Boyer-Fonfrêde, Brissot, Carra, Gaspard-Séverin Duchastel, the younger Ducos, Dufriche de Valazé, Jean Duprat, Fauchet, Gardien, Gensonné, Lacaze, Lasource, Claude Romain Lauze de Perret, Lehardi, Benoît Lesterpt-Beauvais, the elder Minvielle, the Marquis de Sillery, Vergniaud and Louis-François-Sébastien Viger). Those were sent to trial. Another 39 were included in the final acte d'accusation, accepted by the Convention on 24 October 1793, which stated the crimes for which they were to be tried as their perfidious ambition, their hatred of Paris, their "federalism" and above all their responsibility for the attempt of their escaped colleagues to provoke civil war.

1793 trial of Girondins 

The trial of the 22 began before the Revolutionary Tribunal on 24 October 1793. The verdict was a foregone conclusion. On 31 October, they were borne to the guillotine. It took 36 minutes to decapitate all of them, including Charles Éléonor Dufriche de Valazé, who had committed suicide the previous day upon hearing the sentence he was given.

Of those who escaped to the provinces, after wandering about singly or in groups most were either captured and executed or committed suicide. They included Barbaroux, Buzot, Condorcet, Grangeneuve, Guadet, Kersaint, Pétion, Rabaut de Saint-Etienne and Rebecqui. Roland killed himself at Rouen on 15 November 1793, a week after the execution of his wife. A very few escaped, including Jean-Baptiste Louvet de Couvrai, whose Mémoires give a detailed picture of the sufferings of the fugitives.

Girondins as martyrs 
The survivors of the party made an effort to re-enter the Convention after the fall of Robespierre on 27 July 1794, but it was not until 5 March 1795 that they were formally re-instated forming the Council of Five Hundred under the Directory. On 3 October of that same year (11 Vendémiaire, year IV), a solemn fête in honour of the Girondins, "martyrs of liberty", was celebrated in the Convention.

In her autobiography, Madame Roland reshapes her historical image by stressing the popular connection between sacrifice and female virtue. Her Mémoires de Madame Roland (1795) was written from prison where she was held as a Girondin sympathizer. It covers her work for the Girondins while her husband Jean-Marie Roland was Interior Minister. The book echoes such popular novels as Rousseau's Julie or the New Héloise by linking her feminine virtue and motherhood to her sacrifice in a cycle of suffering and consolation. Roland says her mother's death was the impetus for her "odyssey from virtuous daughter to revolutionary heroine" as it introduced her to death and sacrifice – with the ultimate sacrifice of her own life for her political beliefs. She helped her husband escape, but she was executed  on 8 November 1793. A week later he committed suicide.

A monument to the Girondins was erected in Bordeaux between 1893 and 1902 dedicated to the memory of the Girondin deputies who were victims of the Terror.  The vagueness of who actually made up the Girondins led to the monument not having any names inscribed on it until 1989.  Even then, the deputies to the Convention who were memorialized were only those hailing from the Gironde department, omitting notable people like Brissot and Madame Roland.

Ideology 

The words Girondin and Montagnard are defined as political groups―more specific definitions are the subject of theorizing by historians. The two words were much tossed about by partisans with various understandings of what they were intended to represent. The two groups lacked formal political structures, and the differences between them have never been satisfactorily explained. It has been suggested that the word Girondin as a useful term be abandoned.

Influenced by classical liberalism and the concepts of democracy, human rights and Montesquieu's separation of powers, the Girondins initially supported the constitutional monarchy, but after the Flight to Varennes in which Louis XVI tried to flee Paris in order to start a counter-revolution the Girondins became mostly republicans, with a royalist minority.  Like the Jacobins, they were also influenced by the writings of Jean-Jacques Rousseau.

In its early times of government, the Gironde supported a free market - opposing price controls on goods (e.g., a 1793 maximum on grain prices), supported by a constitutional right to public assistance for the poor and public education.  With Brissot, they advocated exporting the Revolution through aggressive foreign policies including war against the surrounding European monarchies. The Girondins were also one of the first supporters of abolitionism in France with Brissot leading the anti-slavery Society of the Friends of the Blacks.  Certain Girondins such as Condorcet supported women's suffrage and political equality.

They sat to the left of the centrist Feuillants, but later sat on the right of the National Assembly after the neutralization of the Feuillants. They were the principal conservative political party in France at the time and opposed the radical course of the revolution, leading to the Reign of Terror. Generally, historians divide the Convention into the left-wing Jacobin Montagnards, the centrist The Plain and the right-wing Girondins.

The Girondins supported democratic reform, secularism and a strong legislature at the expense of a weaker executive and judiciary as opposed to the authoritarian left-wing Montagnards, who supported public acknowledgement of a Supreme Being and a strong executive.

Prominent members 

 Jacques Pierre Brissot (leader)
 Jean-Marie Roland
 Madame Roland 
 Maximin Isnard
 Jacques Guillaume Thouret
 Jean Baptiste Treilhard
 Pierre Victurnien Vergniaud
 Armand Gensonné
 Marquis de Condorcet
 Pierre Claude François Daunou
 Marguerite-Élie Guadet
 Jacques Claude Beugnot
 Louis Gustave le Doulcet
 Claude Fauchet
 François Buzot
 Charles Jean Marie Barbaroux
 François Aubry
 Charles-Louis Antiboul
 Léger-Félicité Sonthonax
 Jérôme Pétion

Electoral results

See also 
 Historiography of the French Revolution
 Liberalism and radicalism in France

References

Citations

General Bibliography 
 
 
 
 
 
 

Attribution:

Further reading 
 Brace, Richard Munthe. "General Dumouriez and the Girondins 1792–1793", American Historical Review (1951) 56#3 pp. 493–509. .
 de Luna, Frederick A. "The 'Girondins' Were Girondins, After All", French Historical Studies (1988) 15: 506-18. .
 DiPadova, Theodore A. "The Girondins and the Question of Revolutionary Government", French Historical Studies (1976) 9#3 pp. 432–450 .
 Ellery, Eloise. Brissot De Warville: A Study in the History of the French Revolution (1915) excerpt and text search.
 François Furet and Mona Ozouf. eds. La Gironde et les Girondins. Paris: éditions Payot, 1991.
 Higonnet, Patrice. "The Social and Cultural Antecedents of Revolutionary Discontinuity: Montagnards and Girondins", English Historical Review (1985): 100#396 pp. 513–544 .
 Thomas Lalevée, "National Pride and Republican grandezza: Brissot's New Language for International Politics in the French Revolution", French History and Civilisation (Vol. 6), 2015, pp. 66–82.
 Lamartine, Alphonse de. History of the Girondists, Volume I: Personal Memoirs of the Patriots of the French Revolution (1847)  online free in Kindle edition; Volume 1, Volume 2 | Volume 3.
 Lewis-Beck, Michael S., Anne Hildreth, and Alan B. Spitzer. "Was There a Girondist Faction in the National Convention, 1792–1793?" French Historical Studies (1988) 11#4 pp.: 519-36. .
 Linton, Marisa, Choosing Terror: Virtue, Friendship and Authenticity in the French Revolution (Oxford University Press, 2013).
 Loomis, Stanley, Paris in the Terror. (1964).
 Patrick, Alison. "Political Divisions in the French National Convention, 1792–93". Journal of Modern History (Dec. 1969) 41#4, pp.: 422–474. ; rejects Sydenham's argument & says Girondins were a real faction.
 Patrick, Alison. The Men of the First French Republic: Political Alignments in the National Convention of 1792 (1972), comprehensive study of the group's role.
 Scott, Samuel F., and Barry Rothaus. Historical Dictionary of the French Revolution 1789–1799 (1985) Vol. 1 pp. 433–36 online.
 Sutherland, D. M. G. France 1789–1815: Revolution and Counter-Revolution (2nd ed., 2003) ch. 5. 
 Sydenham, Michael J. "The Montagnards and Their Opponents: Some Considerations on a Recent Reassessment of the Conflicts in the French National Convention, 1792–93", Journal of Modern History (1971) 43#2 pp. 287–293 ; argues that the Girondins faction was mostly a myth created by Jacobins.
 Whaley, Leigh Ann. Radicals: Politics and Republicanism in the French Revolution. Gloucestershire, England: Sutton Publishing, 2000.

External links 

 
1792 establishments in France
1793 disestablishments in France
Abolitionist organizations
Conservative liberal parties
France 1791
Defunct political parties in France
French National Convention
Groups of the French Revolution
Liberal parties in France
Political parties established in 1792
Political parties disestablished in 1793
Monarchist parties in France